Inanda is a suburb of Sandton, Johannesburg, South Africa. It is situated in Region 3, on Rivonia Road about 1.5 km from Sandton city. The suburb contains the Inanda Club, an elite equestrian and Polo establishment,  and St David's Marist Inanda, a primary and high school with a combined intake of over 1100 pupils.

References

Johannesburg Region E